Lummy Graham is a New Zealand former rugby league footballer who represented New Zealand in the 1970 World Cup.

Playing career
Graham played for the Manukau Magpies in the Auckland Rugby League competition and also represented Auckland. In 1970 he was selected for the New Zealand national rugby league team and played three matches from the bench at the 1970 World Cup.

References

Living people
New Zealand rugby league players
New Zealand national rugby league team players
Auckland rugby league team players
Manukau Magpies players
Rugby league fullbacks
Year of birth missing (living people)